Aalto University is a public research university located in , Finland. It was established in 2010 as a merger of three major Finnish universities: the Helsinki University of Technology, the Helsinki School of Economics and the University of Art and Design Helsinki. The close collaboration between the scientific, business and arts communities is intended to foster multi-disciplinary education and research.

The Finnish government, in 2010, set out to create a university that fosters innovation, merging the three institutions into one. The university is composed of six schools with close to 17,500 students and 4,000 staff members, making it Finland's second largest university.

Aalto University's operations showcase Finland's experiment in higher education. The Aalto Design Factory, Aalto Ventures Program and Aalto Entrepreneurship Society (Aaltoes), among others, drive the university's mission for a radical shift towards multidisciplinary learning and have contributed substantially to the emergence of Helsinki as a hotbed for startups. Aaltoes is Europe's largest and most active student run entrepreneurship community that has founded major concepts such as the Startup Sauna accelerator program and the Slush startup event.

History 
Following this, president of the University of Art and Design Helsinki at the time, proposed the merger of Aalto University's founding schools in his president's opening speech in 2005. 's line of reasoning was that this move would create a unique interdisciplinary university that was needed to create new innovative thought.

The idea received attention within the Finnish Ministry of Education, which appointed , a leading official at the Ministry of Finance, to investigate the possibility of a merger. After Sailas' group reported that it considered the merger to be beneficial to the Finnish academic world and economy, the Finnish government decided to go on with the project on 11 November 2007.

On 29 May 2008 the government announced that the new university would be named after the Finnish architect  in honor of his achievements in technology, economics and art. On 19 December 2008  was selected by the board to be the first president of Aalto University.

Aalto University started operating on 1 January 2010. In the process of creating the university the university law of Finland was rewritten for the university to be allowed to collect endowment. The university managed to reach its goal of collecting 200 million euros in private donations. The sum was augmented by 2.5 times by the Finnish state.

In a 2017 analysis by The Times Higher Education, Aalto University ranked 55th among technology challenger universities.

Helsinki University of Technology 

As the Aalto University was founded the four schools of science and engineering were formed out of the departments of the Helsinki University of Technology (TKK), founded in 1849 by Grand Duke Nicholas I. It received university status in 1908. At the time of creation of Aalto University, TKK had about 250 professors and approximately 15,000 students. This means the largest part of the Aalto University is formed from the former Helsinki University of Technology.

In 2011, the former University of Technology (then known as Aalto University School of Science and Technology) was split up into four schools, corresponding to the former TKK faculties: School of Chemical Technology (CHEM), School of Electrical Engineering (ELEC), School of Engineering (ENG), and School of Science (SCI).

Helsinki School of Economics 

It operated as a private university until 1974, when the state of Finland was given the financial responsibility of the university.

Following the merger, the university was briefly renamed Aalto University School of Economics, and is currently known as Aalto University School of Business (Aalto BIZ).

University of Art and Design Helsinki 

The University of Art and Design Helsinki has been the largest art university in the Nordic countries. It was founded in 1871. Media Centre Lume – the National Research and Development Center of audiovisual media – is also located in the university. The university awarded the following academic degrees: Bachelor of Arts, Master of Arts, and Doctor of Arts.

The university has been active in establishing research projects and industrial collaborations via the private sector. During the rectorship of  the university was active in integrating design into Finnish innovation networks.

Following the merger, the university was briefly renamed Aalto University School of Art and Design. In 2012, the Department of Architecture, which historically has been a part of the Helsinki University of Technology, was moved to the school, and the name was changed to Aalto University School of Art, Design and Architecture (Aalto ARTS).

The department of photography at Aalto University School of Art, Design and Architecture (Aalto ARTS) is home to what is known as The Helsinki School, a selected group of photographers from Aalto University School of Arts, Design and Architecture that has been the model for a new approach to education as well as a vehicle for collaborative thought and cooperation.

Administration and organisation

Governance 
The university, which is incorporated as Aalto University Foundation, is governed by the seven-member Aalto University Foundation Board. The board decides on the foundation's strategy, operation and financial issues, is responsible for any far-reaching plans and appoints the university president and vice rectors. Formerly working as the provost of Aalto University,  was elected president of Aalto University in 2017. The university is organized into six schools with their respective deans and administrative structures.

Schools 
The university is organized since the beginning of 2011 into six schools formed out of the three merged universities. Each school has several departments and separate laboratories as well as a number of separate research and other units.
 School of Arts, Design and Architecture (Aalto ARTS)
 School of Chemical Engineering (Aalto CHEM)
 School of Business (Aalto BIZ)
 School of Electrical Engineering (Aalto ELEC)
 School of Engineering (Aalto ENG)
 School of Science (Aalto SCI)

Other units and institutes 
 Aaltoes (Aalto Entrepreneurship Society), student-run entrepreneurship community
 Aalto University Learning Centre
 Aalto University Executive Education
 Factories – interdisciplinary collaboration networks:
 Design Factory
 Media Factory
 Aalto Science Institute – interdisciplinary research initiative
 Helsinki Institute for Information Technology (joint research unit with University of Helsinki)
 Helsinki Institute of Physics (operated jointly with University of Helsinki, University of Jyväskylä, Lappeenranta University of Technology and Tampere University of Technology)
 Metsähovi Radio Observatory is part of Aalto ELEC.

Academics

Studies

Study in Science and Technology 

However, the schools of science and technology do not offer programs terminating in a bachelor's degree; a student may only be accepted to study for the Master's level degree. The schools of science and technology require a bachelor's degree from foreign students studying in English, because only Master's studies are offered completely in English.

Undergraduate studies are generally quite similar in between different programs with a considerable part being taken by a tuition of a solid base in mathematics and physics.

Apart from numerous programs in Finnish/Swedish, various international Master's programs are offered exclusively for studies in English.

Finnish students are accepted mainly on the basis of result in the national DIA entrance exam. The exam variant taken by most entrants mainly tests quantitative ability in mathematics, physics and chemistry, but specialized tests are available for students applying to a number of programs. The score required for entry to the Aalto University varies much depending on the intended field of study, however, in general the scores required for the Aalto University are higher than for any other university granting entry through the DIA exam. For example, the mean sum of mathematics and physics DIA exam scores was 7.2 in the year 2010, whereas the mean minimum sum of mathematics and physics exam scores for gaining admission to an Aalto program was 17.1–20.1, depending on the priority point distribution. Aalto also contains five of the most selective programs with respect to the matriculation exam scores, out of approximately total of 50 university technology programs in the nation, of which approximately 30 are outside of Aalto, and the three most selective programs with respect to entrance exam and combined scores. The minimum scores required for these top programs are in the 95th–99th percentile range of the whole applicant pool, and approximately 98th-99.8th percentile of what would be the score distribution of the whole age group.

Study in Arts, Design and Architecture 

The School of Arts, Design and Architecture has been a leader in art and design education in Finland for over 138 years. It is an international postgraduate university institution with students from over 50 countries. It offers doctorate, master and bachelor's degrees in a wide range of disciplines – fine art, design, new media, art education, visual culture, motion picture and production design. School of Arts, Design and Architecture is a pioneer in research and in developing interdisciplinary study programmes.

The school received its current name in the beginning of 2012 when the architecture department moved in from the School of Engineering (previously part of Helsinki University of Technology). The architecture programmes lead to the Master of Science degrees in architecture and landscape architecture.

In 2021, Aalto University was ranked the sixth globally according to the QS World University Rankings by the subject Art and Design.

Study in Business 

The School of Business offers degrees in economics and business administration at the Bachelor, Master, Licentiate and Doctoral levels, along with MBA programs targeted to business professionals. Many of the degrees and programs are offered in English.

In its degree programs, the school has a two-step program structure with a three-year bachelor's degree followed by a two-year master's degree. A doctoral degree normally takes four additional years. Financial Times ranked Aalto University School of Business 29th in the European Business school rankings in 2013.

Aalto University School of Business is located at the  campus. The school offers two Bachelor of Science Programs (one in Finnish at the  campus and the other in English at the  campus) and 13 Master of Science Programs (12 are offered in English).

The Aalto University School of Business is the first business school in Finland and the first business school in the Nordic countries to have received all three labels of excellence from the world's leading business school accreditation bodies: AACSB, AMBA, EQUIS. This Triple Crown status is an honor held by only few business schools worldwide. The school is also an active member of the CEMS (Global Alliance in Management Education) and PIM (Partnership in International Management).

MBA programs 
The MBA program is taught through two-week modules by visiting faculty from some of the top business schools in the world, including Emory University, Rutgers Business School, University of South Carolina, Georgetown University, UCLA, Concordia University, Queen's University, Rotterdam School of Management, Indiana University, ESADE and INSEAD. Aalto University Executive Education Ltd also offers a double degree Executive MBA Program in partnership with Esade Business School. Financial Times ranked Aalto University School of Business 78th in Global MBA programs, 85th in Executive MBA programs.

Research 

Aalto University has defined four fundamental competence areas: ICT and digitalisation, Materials and sustainable use of natural resources, Global business dynamics and Art and design knowledge building. In addition to these, the university invests in three integrative multidisciplinary themes: Advanced energy solutions, Health and wellbeing, and Human-centred living environments.

Researchers at Aalto University have achieved notability in, among other things, low temperature physics (holding the current world record for the lowest temperature achieved), the development of devices and methods for magnetoencephalography, mobile communications, wood processing, and neural networks, with professor  initiating research in self-organizing maps. More recently, the university has notably invested in the research of nanotechnology, operating the largest cleanroom facility in Northern Europe and one of the largest microscopy clusters in Europe. MilliLab, a joint laboratory of VTT and Aalto University, built one of the radio receivers in the Planck probe, which maps the cosmic microwave background for determining the age and composition of the universe.

Centres of Excellence 
Aalto University has participated in nine centres of excellence during 2008–2019, selected by the Academy of Finland to represent the top research in the country, and receiving separate, fixed-period funding from the academy.

 Centre of Excellence in Generic Intelligent Machines Research 
Centre of Excellence in Smart Radios and Wireless Research
Centre of Excellence in Computational Nanoscience
 Centre of Excellence in Computational Inference
 Centre of Excellence in Laser Scanning Research
 Centre of Excellence in Low Temperature Quantum Phenomena and Devices
 Centre of Excellence in Molecular Engineering of Biosynthetic Hybrid Materials
 Centre of Excellence in Molecular Systems Immunology and Physiology, together with University of Helsinki and University of Turku
 Centre of Excellence in Research on Solar Long-Term Variability and Effects, together with University of Oulu and Finnish Meteorological Institute
Currently, Aalto University participates in three Centre of Excellences (2018–2025):

 Centre of Excellence in Quantum Technology 
 Centre of Excellence of Inverse modelling and Imaging, together with University of Helsinki
 Centre of Excellence in Research of Sustainable Space, together with Finnish Meteorological Institute

Network Memberships 
 BALTECH 
 Conference of European Schools for Advanced Engineering Education and Research (CESAER)
 Consortium Linking Universities of Science and Technology for Education and Research (CLUSTER)
 Cumulus
 Global Education for European Engineers and Entrepreneurs (GE4)
 The European Association for the Transfer of Technologies, Innovation and Industrial Information (TII)
 T.I.M.E. Association (TIME)
 ProTon Europe, the European Knowledge Transfer Association
 Partnership in International Management (PIM)
 European Society for Engineering Education (SEFI)
 European Council of Landscape Architecture Schools (ECLAS)
 European Association for International Education (EAIE)
 Community of European Management Schools and International Companies (CEMS)
 The European Association for University Lifelong Learning (EUCEN)
 University Consortium of Pori
University Network for Innovation, Technology and Engineering (UNITE!)

Campuses 

Otaniemi Campus 

The Aalto University metro station connects  to  via the  line.

There are over one hundred student organizations on campus, which provide a range of opportunities to take part in pastimes of various kinds, from sports to music.

Other locations 
As of 2019, the building is under renovation and primarily used by Aalto University Executive Education

Culture and student life 

The Aalto University students are known for active student life.

An integral part of many student traditions play the brightly colored overalls worn to many events. The color of the overall signals what the student studies (e.g. the economy students are recognized from dollar green overalls). The student community has also organised important charity events. In fact, the name for these events , has entered common language to describe any carnival-like charity event.

The students of technology are especially noticeable, as they wear a distinctive hat with a tuft on many occasions (both formal and informal). Technology students are also famous for, and Finland's leading practitioners of, student pranks, similar in principle to MIT hacks. Their most widely publicised stunt took place in 1961, when a team of students smuggled a statue of  onto the 300-year-old wreck of Regalskeppet Vasa just days before its lifting from the bottom of the sea.

Although student traditions vary in between the different constituent schools common activities started to burgeon early after the foundation of Aalto University. The event was such a success that the follow-up Aalto on waves is planned to arrange a trip by boat to South America. Aalto on Tracks also spurred students of Tongji University to arrange Tongji on Tracks which essentially takes the journey of Aalto on Tracks in the opposite direction.

Aalto Entrepreneurship Society is a multi-disciplinary society uniting students and graduates of all disciplines of the university. It aims to encourage high-tech, high-growth, scalable entrepreneurship by arranging get-togethers to spark ideas and innovations and aid start-up initiatives among the Aalto students.

Aalto Festival and MoA 
Aalto Festival (2015–2019), formerly known as Masters of Aalto (2012–2014), and the Masters of Arts festival, MoA (2002–2011), and Think 2000 was an annual event in May where the newly graduated of the multidisciplinary university met the public.
 
An extensive exhibition showcased a wide array of works: everything from distinguished theses, individual statements, concepts and products arising from commercial collaboration to works of art. For the graduating students, the exhibition was an opportunity to interact with society, future employers, the media and other influential parties.

Aalto Festival consisted of a varying program with exhibitions, seminars, discussions, films, workshops and guided tours.

Student Union 
Aalto University Student Union (AYY in short) is the official student union of Aalto University. Every bachelor's and master's degree student enrolled in Aalto University is a member of the Student Union.

The purpose of AYY is to represent the students, look after their interests, and support the community of 15,000 students. AYY provides its members with a variety of services such as healthcare, recreation and housing. The Student Union is financed by membership fees, investments and profits from student housing.

Aalto University Student Union was formed in the beginning of 2010 through a merger between the respective student unions of the merged universities.

The Aalto University is also one of the two universities in Finland to host one or more Nations, a Finnish type of student corporation. AU's only nation is Teknologföreningen (TF) and its goal is to unite Swedish-speaking students at the university. The nation is housed in its peculiar building called . Since 1972, when the corresponding Finnish-speaking nation  was abolished, there are no nations for the Finnish-speaking students, though the 15 regional nations at the University of Helsinki, both Finnish- and Swedish-speaking, do welcome AU students as members.

Associations 

In addition to the student union, Aalto university students have formed numerous associations for studies, cultural activity and sports. There are more than 150 associations maintained by university students.

List of student associations 

Currently this list includes only the associations known to have English Wikipedia articles.

 The Polytech Choir
 Polyteknikkojen Ilmailukerho (Flying club)
 Helsinki Academic Male Choir KYL

Student housing 
The housing is characterised by the presence of foreign students of many nationalities. As of 2005, the village offers housing for approximately 2,600 students.

Some of the building material originally used for the campus was acquired from the former Soviet Union embassy, which had been destroyed during World War II, as a result of bombings by the Soviet Union itself. The student housing has been used for housing athletes again in e.g. the 2005 World Championships in Athletics, sometimes to the dismay of the students that have to move out during the events. The quality of the Otaniemi student housing holds a high standard in international comparison.

Some student housing is also available in the vicinity of the other campuses.

In 1993, the building was permanently rented to the university to act as a conference and continuing education center and later sold due to high maintenance costs. It is regularly used for conventions, congresses and student parties.

Notable people and famous alumni 

All three constituent schools have played an integral part in educating many of the top names in their respective fields in Finland. After the Second World War Finland's economy grew and Finnish companies became players in the international markets requiring highly educated expertise and leadership. Both the schools of technology and economy catered to this need as the premier schools of their fields in the country. During the latter part of the 20th century the schools had to increase their student intake considerably to meet the demands of growing markets.

See also 
 Aalto University Library
 Institute of technology
 List of universities in Finland
 Software Industry Survey
 Top Industrial Managers for Europe (TIME) network for student mobility

Notes

References

External links 

 
 School of Arts, Design and Architecture
 School of Business 
 School of Chemical Technology
 School of Electrical Engineering
 School of Engineering
 School of Science

 
Education in Helsinki
Technical universities and colleges in Finland
Modernist architecture in Finland
Alvar Aalto buildings
Forestry education
Educational institutions established in 1849
Education in Espoo
Engineering universities and colleges in Finland
1849 establishments in the Russian Empire
1849 establishments in Finland
Alvar Aalto
Universities and colleges formed by merger in Finland